Marcus Fabius Calvus van Ravenna was an author and translator of the works of Hippocrates. He first translated the Hippocratic Corpus into Latin in Rome, 1525.

References

Bibliography 
 .

Greek–Latin translators
16th-century writers